The role of African Americans in the agricultural history of the United States includes roles as the main work force when they were enslaved on cotton and tobacco plantations in the Antebellum South. After the Emancipation Proclamation in 1863-1865 most stayed in farming as very poor sharecroppers, who rarely owned land. They began the Great Migration to cities in the mid-20th century. About 40,000 are farmers today.

History

Eighteenth century
Plantation owners brought a mass  of slaves from Africa and the Caribbean and Mexico to farm the fields during cotton harvests. Black women and children were also enslaved in the industry. The growth of Slavery in the United States is closely tied to the expansion of plantation agriculture. The contributions of enslaved people on early American agriculture has largely been discounted and ignored, mainly because of the lack of records not created by the slaveholder, often writing to justify enslavement

However, many plantation owners relied on the agricultural knowledge that Africans brought over from across the Atlantic. Perhaps the best example of this is rice cultivation in South Carolina, relying on indigenous West African knowledge of growing Oryza glaberrima. This specific knowledge was invaluable in transforming South Carolina into a rice producing powerhouse. 

While enslaved, African Americans on plantations found ways to supplement their meager food rations by cultivating slave gardens. These slave gardens were usually near the slave cabins or remote areas of the plantation, and provided slaves with three benefits: nourishment, financial independence, and medicinal uses. These slave gardens allowed enslaved people some level of autonomy and agency; when they grew more than they could consume, they were able to sell.

Nineteenth century

Antebellum South
The great majority of black farmworkers before 1865 were enslaved workers on Southern farms and plantations. Smaller numbers were free employees or farm owners. In South Carolina there were about 400 free black farmers in the rural parishes surrounding Charleston. As farmers their strategies, production, and rural lives resembled the poor white neighbors. Survival was a high priority and involved establishing economic self-sufficiency through concentration on food crops for their own families, and then by cultivating social advantages such as having a rich white patron.

Virginia had a large free black element. By 1860, there were 58,000 free Black people living in Virginia; 80 percent in rural areas. Most lived on the Eastern Shore. One out of eight Black people in the state was free and the rest were enslaved in 1860. There were severe legal restrictions and terms of nonvoting, not testifying in court, not attending schools. Newly manumitted ex-slaves had to leave the state. However the same property laws were applied, allowing free Black people to own and operated 1202 small farms in 1860. They were patronized by some wealthy white landowners, who would hire them for cash wages from time to time. They were especially needed at harvest time,  and when it was necessary to replant the small tobacco plants. It was a political movement in 1853 to expel all free Black people from Virginia, but key White landowners intervened to block the proposal; they appreciated and often needed the labor of the free Black people. From the point of view of the free Black people, The small amounts of cash were useful; probably even more useful it was to be paid with old clothes, used tools, or young animals in lieu of cash wages. Above all, it was essential to their survival to be useful and available to politically powerful white neighbors.

After emancipation
After emancipation and the passage of the thirteenth amendment, Black slaves were legally freed, but most of them lacked any kind of material wealth and were thus led into other oppressive relationships. Many Black agriculturists were subjugated to land tenure agreements and working as sharecroppers, tenant farmers, and within the crop-lien system. Southern black cotton farmers faced discrimination from the north. Many white Democrats were concerned about how many of African Americans were being employed in the US cotton industry and the dramatic growth of black landowners. They urged white farmers in the south to take control of the industry, which from time to time resulted in strikes by black cotton pickers; for instance Black people led by the Colored Farmer's Association (CFA) strikers from Memphis organized the Cotton pickers strike of 1891 in Lee County in September, which resulted in much violence.

Black cotton farmers were very important to entrepreneurs which emerged during industrialization in the United States, particularly Henry Ford. The United States Emancipation Proclamation came into power on January 1, 1863, allowing a "new journey for people of African ancestry to participate in the U.S. Agriculture Industry in a new way."

Sharecropping became widespread in the South during and after the Reconstruction Era.

Twentieth century

The conditions for black cotton farmers gradually improved during the twentieth century. Ralph J. Bunche, an expert in Negro suffrage in the United States, observed in 1940 that "many thousands of black cotton farmers each year now go to the polls, stand in line with their white neighbors, and mark their ballots independently without protest or intimidation, in order to determine government policy toward cotton production control." However, discrimination towards Black people continued as it did in the rest of society, and isolated incidents often broke out. On 25 September 1961 Herbert Lee, a black cotton farmer and voter-registration organizer, was shot on the head by white State legislator E. H. Hurst in Liberty, Mississippi. Yet the cotton industry continued to be very important for Black people in the southern United States, much more so than for whites. By the late 1920s around two-thirds of all African-American tenants and almost three-fourths of the croppers worked on cotton farms. 3 out of every 4 black farm operators earned at least 40% of their income from cotton farming during this period. Studies conducted during the same period indicated that 2 in 3 black women from black landowning families were involved in cotton farming. In 1920, 24% (218,612) of farms in the nation were Black-operated, less than 1% (2,026) were managed by Black people, and 76% (705,070) of Black farm operators were tenants.

The cotton industry in the United States hit a crisis in the early 1920s. Cotton and tobacco prices collapsed in 1920 following overproduction and the boll weevil pest wiped out the sea island cotton crop in 1921. Annual production slumped from 1,365,000 bales in the 1910s to 801,000 in the 1920s. In South Carolina, Williamsburg County production fell from 37,000 bales in 1920 to 2,700 bales in 1922 and one farmer in McCormick County produced 65 bales in 1921 and just 6 in 1922. As a result of the devastating harvest of 1922, some 50,000 black cotton workers left South Carolina, and by the 1930s the state population had declined some 15%, largely due to cotton stagnation. However, it wasn't the collapse of prices or pests which resulted in the mass decline of African American employment in agriculture in the American south. The mechanization of agriculture is undoubtedly the most important reason why many Black people moved to northern American cities in the 1940s and 1950s during the "Great Migration" as mechanization of agriculture was introduced, leaving many unemployed. The Hopson Planting Company produced the first crop of cotton to be entirely planted, harvested and baled by machinery in 1944.

Twenty-first century

In 2010, the United States Department of Agriculture vowed to pay some forty thousand black farmers $1.2 billion in total, as compensation for years of undue discrimination. Though funds were intended to be distributed by the end of 2012, the black farmers had yet to receive the designated remuneration by March 2013. In all, farmers in Pigford I who filed timely claims had received over $1 billion in payments. More than 60,000 farmers submitted late claim petitions in Pigford I. Late claimants in Pigford I were able to receive $1.1 billion in payments in the Pigford II claims process. 33,000 Black farmers in Pigford II received decision letters dated August 30, 2013, resulting from the late claims process that closed on May 11, 2012. About 18,000 Pigford II claims were eventually decided in favor of the farmers and 15,000 claims were denied.

As of 2012, there were 44,629 African-American farmers in the United States. The vast majority of  African-American farmers were in southern states.

In 2021, the Biden Administration proposed the American Rescue Plan, which will support agriculture, and of this, $10.4 billion will be allocated to "disadvantaged" farmers; Black farmers make up a quarter of these farmers. While the plan is associated with the administration's COVID-19 stimulus relief packages, it is the first wave of relief for Black farmers since the extent of the debt-relief Pigford v. Glickman was to offer.

In popular culture

Picking cotton was often a subject which was mentioned in songs by African-American blues and jazz musicians in the 1920s–1940s, reflecting their grievances. In 1940, jazz pianist Duke Ellington composed "Cotton Tail" and blues musician Lead Belly wrote "Cotton Fields". In 1951, Big Mama Thornton wrote "Cotton Picking Blues." A number of blues and jazz musicians had worked on cotton plantations. Blues pianist Joe Willie "Pinetop" Perkins for instance had once been a tractor driver on a Mississippi plantation before enjoying a successful career with Muddy Waters. Lord Buckley once sang a song titled "Black Cross", pertaining to an educated black farmer murdered by a mob comprising white men.

See also

George Washington Carver
 Black Belt in the American South
Black land loss in the United States

References

Further reading
 Alston, Lee J., and Joseph P. Ferrie. "Social Control and Labor Relations in the American South Before the Mechanization of the Cotton Harvest in the 1950s" Journal of Institutional and Theoretical Economics  (1989): 133-157 Online.
 Brown, D. Clayton. King Cotton: A Cultural, Political, and Economic History since 1945 (University Press of Mississippi, 2011) 440 pp. 
 Davis, Allison. Deep South: A Social Anthropological Study of Caste and Class (1941) classic case study from the late 1930s
 
 Johnson, Charles S. Statistical atlas of southern counties: listing and analysis of socio-economic indices of 1104 southern counties (1941). excerpt
 Kirby, Jack Temple. Rural Worlds Lost: The American South, 1920-1960 (LSU Press, 1986) major scholarly survey with detailed bibliography; online free to borrow.
 McDonald, Robin, and Valerie Pope Burnes. Visions of the Black Belt: A Cultural Survey of the Heart of Alabama (University of Alabama Press, 2015).
 Ouzts, Clay. "Landlords and tenants: sharecropping and the cotton culture in Leon County, Florida, 1865-1885." Florida Historical Quarterly 75.1 (1996): 1-23. Online
 Raper, Arthur F. Preface to peasantry: A tale of two black belt counties (1936, reprinted  Univ of South Carolina Press, 2005), a classic study of Black Belt life  excerpts; Online free to borrow.
 Reynolds, Bruce J. Black farmers in America, 1865-2000: the pursuit of independent farming and the role of cooperatives (US Department of Agriculture . No. 1502-2016-130760. 2003) Online.
 Rothman, Adam.  Slave Country: American Expansion and the Origins of the Deep South (2007)
 Sharpless, Rebecca. Fertile ground, narrow choices: Women on Texas cotton farms, 1900-1940 ( UNC Press Books, 1999).
 Sumners, Joe A. and Amelia H. Stehouwer. "Politics and Economic Development in the Southern Black Belt" in The Oxford handbook of Southern politics ed. by  Charles S. Bullock III and Mark J. Rozell. (2010).
 U. S. Civil Rights Commission. The Decline of Black Farming in America (1982).
 Vance, Rupert B. Regionalism and the South (UNC Press Books, 1982).
 Whayne, Jeannie. "Race in the Reconstruction of Rural Society in the Cotton South since the Civil War." in Race and Rurality in the Global Economy ed by Michaeline A. Crichlow, et al.  (2018): 247–284.
 Wimberley, Dale W. "Quality of life trends in the Southern Black Belt, 1980-2005: a research note." Journal of Rural Social Sciences 25.1 (2010) Online.
 Winemiller, Terance L. "Black Belt Region in Alabama" Encyclopedia of Alabama (2009) online

External links
 Black Farmers and Agriculturalists Association Inc.

African-American history
History of agriculture in the United States